Rene Gube is an American comedian, actor and writer. He played Threepeat on the TBS sitcom Ground Floor, and was executive story editor and a writer for the CW show Crazy Ex-Girlfriend where he also had a recurring role as "Father Brah."

Early life 
Gube grew up in Rancho Peñasquitos, San Diego. He is Filipino.

He got his taste of comedy while at Mount Carmel High School where he joined a speech and debate club.

Career 
Prior to his career as a comedian, Gube used to be a high school teacher. When in Los Angeles, Gube formed a comedy sketch group, Touchblue, with his friends. Their sketches got quite popular which allowed him to perform on various stages throughout California.

Gube frequently performs with the Upright Citizens Brigade, where he studied. He served as Supervising Producer and writer for Crazy Ex-Girlfriend, in which he also recurred as laid-back Catholic priest Father Brah.

Personal life 
On October 16, 2014, Gube became engaged to his Ground Floor co-star Briga Heelan. They were married on May 8, 2015. Their daughter Bennet Alejandra Gube was born on March 23, 2017.

Filmography

References

External links 
 
 

Living people
21st-century American male actors
American male television actors
American male telenovela actors
Place of birth missing (living people)
Male actors from San Diego
American male actors of Filipino descent
Upright Citizens Brigade Theater performers
Comedians from California
21st-century American comedians
Year of birth missing (living people)